Wáng Shímǐn (c. 1592–1680) was a Chinese landscape painter during the late Ming Dynasty and early Qing Dynasty (1644–1911).

Born in the Jiangsu province, Wang grew up in an artistic, scholarly environment. His grandfather was a prime minister in the late Ming dynasty, and his father was a Hanlin Academy editor for the court, who had studied with Tung Ch'i-ch'ang. After learning painting and calligraphy at a young age, Wang worked as a government official. However he fell ill due to exhaustion on a trip to Nanking in 1630. Wang returned to his homeland and immersed himself in art, creating numerous works. Wang's works place him in an elevated group known as the Four Wangs, also part of the Six Masters of the early Qing period.

Wang painted After Wang Wei's "Snow Over Rivers and Mountains", which can be viewed at the National Palace Museum, Taipei.

Wang was the grandfather and tutor of Wang Yuanqi (1642–1715), who was also a notable landscape painter and a member of the Six Masters of the early Qing period.

References

External links
Landscapes Clear and Radiant: The Art of Wang Hui (1632-1717), an exhibition catalog from The Metropolitan Museum of Art (fully available online as PDF), which contains material on Wang Shimin (see index)

1590s births
1680 deaths
Ming dynasty landscape painters
Qing dynasty landscape painters
Painters from Suzhou
Politicians from Suzhou
Ming dynasty politicians
17th-century Chinese painters
People from Taicang